Al-Hay Sport Club, is an Iraqi football team based in Al-Hay, Wasit, that plays in Iraq Division Two.

Managerial history
  Alaa Naji
  Sajjad Banwan
  Majed Kadhim

See also 
 2021–22 Iraq FA Cup

References

External links
 Al-Hay SC on Goalzz.com
 Iraq Clubs- Foundation Dates

1972 establishments in Iraq
Association football clubs established in 1972
Football clubs in Wasit